Morné Hanekom (born 15 February 1988) is a South African rugby union player, currently playing with the .

He was born in Malmesbury and represented  at various youth levels. He was included in the  squad for the 2009 Vodacom Cup and played for the University of Stellenbosch in the FNB Varsity Cup in 2008 and 2009.

References

South African rugby union players
Living people
1988 births
Leopards (rugby union) players
Western Province (rugby union) players
Griquas (rugby union) players
Eastern Province Elephants players
Rugby union number eights
Stellenbosch University alumni
People from Swartland Local Municipality
Rugby union players from the Western Cape